The 12th Biathlon World Championships were held in 1973 in Lake Placid, United States. It is the first time the championships took place outside Europe.

Men's results

20 km individual

4 × 7.5 km relay

Medal table

References

1973
Biathlon World Championships
International sports competitions hosted by the United States
1973 in American sports
1973 in sports in New York (state)
Sports in Lake Placid, New York
Biathlon competitions in the United States
March 1973 sports events in the United States
International sports competitions in New York (state)
Multisports in the United States